Kila Saifullah railway station is a station in Killa Saifullah District Pakistan.

See also
 List of railway stations in Pakistan
 Pakistan Railways

References

External links

Railway stations in Killa Saifullah District
Railway stations on Zhob Valley Railway Line